Siddapur, Sidapur, Siddapura, or Sidapura are names of a number of towns, villages and administrative divisions in India. They include;

 Siddapura, Uttara Kannada
 Siddapur taluk, an administrative region of Uttara Kannada 
 Siddapur, Savanur taluk, Haveri
 Siddapura, Bangalore
 Siddapur, Belgaum, Karnataka
 Siddapur, Bagalkot, Bilagi Taluka, Bagalkot district, Karnataka 
 Siddapura, Kodagu, Karnataka
 Siddapur, Koppala, Karnataka
 Siddapura, Udupi, Karnataka
 Siddapur, Vijayapur

See also
 Sidhpur, Gujarat